Bendt Holger Jørgensen (24 May 1924 – 31 January 2000) was a Danish football player and manager who played as a midfielder. He made two appearances for the Denmark national team from 1950 to 1951.

References

External links
 
 

1924 births
2000 deaths
Footballers from Copenhagen
Danish men's footballers
Association football midfielders
Denmark international footballers
Hvidovre IF players
Boldklubben Frem players
Danish football managers
Boldklubben af 1893 managers
Hvidovre IF managers
Vejle Boldklub managers
Silkeborg IF managers